The Burma Division was a static formation of the British Indian Army. It was created as part of the 1903 reforms of the Indian Army by Herbert Kitchener, 1st Earl Kitchener then Commander-in-Chief, India. The task of such formations was to oversee area brigades commanding Internal Security troops. The formation is best thought of as a provincial or district command rather than as an infantry division.  The headquarters of the division was at Maymyo.

Order of battle
At the start of World War I the division consisted of:

Commander Major General T Pilcher
Rangoon Brigade, Brigadier General Johnstone
4th Battalion Worcestershire Regiment
1st Battalion Royal Munster Fusiliers
66th Punjabis
79th Infantry
89th Punjabis
64th & 75th Batteries Royal Garrison Artillery
22 Mountain Battery Royal Garrison Artillery
Mandalay Brigade, Major General Raitt
1st Battalion Border Regiment
64th Pioneers
80th Infantry
91st Punjabis
1/10th Gurkha Rifles

See also

 List of Indian divisions in World War I

References

Bibliography

External links
 

British Indian Army divisions
Indian World War I divisions
Military units and formations established in 1903